So Many Ways is a 1996 album by The Braxtons.

So Many Ways may also refer to:

 "So Many Ways" (Brook Benton song), 1959
 "So Many Ways" (The Braxtons song), 1996
 "So Many Ways" (Ellie Campbell song), 1999

See also
 So Many Ways/If the Whole World Stopped Lovin', a 1973 album by Eddy Arnold